Konar may refer to:

 Konar (caste), a caste in Tamil Nadu, India
 Kunar Province of Afghanistan
 Kunar River of Afghanistan and Pakistan
 Kunhar River of Pakistan
 Konar River in the Indian state of Jharkhand
 Konar Dam, damming Konar River
 Konar-e Khoshk, a village in Fars Province, Iran
 Konar Baland, a village in Hormozgan Province, Iran
 Konar Bandak, a village in Bushehr Province, Iran
 Konar Bani, a village in Bushehr Province, Iran
 Konar, Chuvashia, a village in the Cuvashia region of Russia
 Konar Esmail, a village in Hormozgan Province, Iran
 Konar Sandal, an archaeological site in Kerman Province, Iran
 Konar Sandal, Iran, a village in Kerman Province, Iran
 Konar Helaleh, a village in Khuzestan Province, Iran
 Konar Kheymeh, a village in Bushehr Province, Iran
 Konar-e Naru, a village in Bushehr Province, Iran
 Konar Siah (disambiguation)
 Konar Tanku, a village in Hormozgan Province, Iran
 Konar-e Torsh, a village in Hormozgan Province, Iran
 Konar Torshan, a village in Bushehr Province, Iran
 Konar Zard, a village in Hormozgan Province, Iran

See also
 Konar (surname)
 Konari (disambiguation)